Decor Cabinets Ltd (also known as the Decor Cabinet Company) is a Manitoba based manufacturer of custom kitchen, bath and specialty cabinetry.

In 2018, The FDMC 300 group ranked Decor as the 120th largest furniture manufacturer in North America. This publication covers trends and news that affect small cabinet shops to large woodworking plants in North America.

Decor Cabinets currently employs more than 500 people between its head office, production plant and showroom.

History

Decor Cabinets Ltd. began producing framed cabinets in Portage la Prairie, Manitoba in 1977.

The company produced framed and frameless products for several years and then moved exclusively into frameless production. In 1985 the company shifted its focus to custom frameless products with full access cabinetry. In 1990 Decor moved to its current location in Morden, Manitoba.

In 2007, Decor Cabinets became the first company in Manitoba to be certified through the WOODMARK Quality Certification Program.

The company was able to gain market share despite fierce competition and the housing market crash in the U.S. that started in 2008.

The company

Decor Cabinets is owned by Stan and Connie Pauls. Its dealer network includes four Canadian provinces and 33 U.S. states.

Community involvement

The company supports a variety of local and international organizations.

In November 2010, Decor Cabinets sponsored the construction of a Spray Park in Morden.

Decor charity classic golf tournament

Since 2004, Decor has hosted the annual Decor Charity Classic Golf Tournament. All proceeds are divided equally among four worthwhile charities with Decor Cabinets matching half of the all net proceeds. Since its inception the tournament has brought in over $1,040,000

CorImpact

Decor Cabinets runs a program called CorImpact in partnership with Opportunity International Canada to support education in African countries, micro-financing for entrepreneurs in Latin American countries amongst other activities.

Environmental commitment

In 2010 Decor was awarded the first CLER Program Green Award by M.S.T.W. Planning District in Morden through its program Greencore.

Decor is part of the Environmental Stewardship Program (ESP). The ESP voluntary program gives cabinet manufacturers a way to demonstrate their commitment to sustainability and helps identify products that are better for the environment.

Health & Safety

In July 2018 Decor Cabinets achieved its SAFE Work Certification by Made Safe.

References

External links
 
 Decor Charity Classic Golf Tournament

Companies based in Manitoba
Morden, Manitoba
1977 establishments in Manitoba
Canadian companies established in 1977
Manufacturing companies established in 1977